U-Boote westwärts! (in English: U-boats Westward!) is a 1941 German war propaganda film promoting the Kriegsmarine. It concerns a U-boat mission in the Battle of the Atlantic and was produced by UFA.

Plot 
The film opens aboard a U-boat as it returns from a mission. It then follows the crew onshore the day before they ship off for their next mission—meeting their family and sweethearts, spending a last night at a club, and so forth. Then they ship off, soon sighting and boarding a Dutch merchant ship, which they inspect for contraband. The boarding of the ship is shown being done professionally and in a non-confrontational manner. While they are aboard the Dutch ship, a Royal Navy ship spots them and tries to torpedo them, but the U-boat ends up sinking it.

Cast 
 Herbert Wilk as Kapitänleutnant Hoffmeister
 Heinz Engelmann as Olt. zur See Wiegand
 Joachim Brennecke as Lt. zur See v. Benedict
 Ernst Wilhelm Borchert as Olt. Griesbach
 Karl John as Matr. Ob. Gefr. Drewitz
 Clemens Hasse as Masch.-Maat Sonntag
 Ilse Werner as Irene Winterfeld
 Admiral Karl Dönitz as himself

Motifs 
The British are shown as cowardly and duplicitous. It also glamorizes death in battle: the British ship was torpedoed even though it had German POWs, and one dies, speaking of the honor of dying for the fatherland.

See also 
 List of German films 1933–1945
 List of World War II films

References

External links 
 
 U-Boote westwärts YouTube - Russian listing

1941 films
1940s war films
Films of Nazi Germany
Films directed by Günther Rittau
World War II submarine films
Nazi World War II propaganda films
U-boat fiction
German black-and-white films
UFA GmbH films
1940s German films
1940s German-language films